George Herbert (25 November 1825 – 15 March 1894) was an Anglican priest. A son of Edward Herbert, 2nd Earl of Powis, he was Dean of Hereford.

Herbert was educated at Eton College and St John's College, Cambridge. At Cambridge, he was president of the University Pitt Club. Ordained in 1850, he began his ministry as a curate at St Mary's Kidderminster. Five years later he became vicar of Clun. In 1867 he was appointed to the deanery of Hereford Cathedral, a post he held until his death.

Notes

1825 births
1894 deaths
People educated at Eton College
Alumni of St John's College, Cambridge
19th-century English Anglican priests
Deans of Hereford
George
Younger sons of earls